Cooney is an unincorporated community in Williams County, in the U.S. state of Ohio.

History
A post office was established at Cooney in 1881, and remained in operation until 1904. A family of settlers probably gave this community their name.

References

Unincorporated communities in Williams County, Ohio
Unincorporated communities in Ohio